1955 Egypt Cup Final, was the final match of the 1954–55 Egypt Cup, was between Zamalek and Al Ittihad Alexandria, Zamalek won the match 2–1.

Route to the final

Match details

References

External links

1955
EC 1955
EC 1955